Isla Bota, or the Boot, is an island in the Gulf of California, located within Bahía de los Ángeles east of the Baja California Peninsula. The island is uninhabited and part of the Ensenada Municipality

Biology

Isla Bota has only one species of reptile, Uta stansburiana (common side-blotched lizard).

References

http://herpatlas.sdnhm.org/places/overview/isla-bota/60/1/

Islands of Baja California
Islands of Ensenada Municipality
Uninhabited islands of Mexico